Giuseppe Aurelio (born 22 March 2000) is an Italian professional footballer who plays as a left back for  club Palermo.

Club career
Born in Bracciano, Aurelio joined Sassuolo Primavera in 2014.

On 29 August 2020, he was loaned to Serie C club Cesena. Aurelio made his professional debut on 27 September 2020, against Virtus Verona. In the middle of the season, on 21 January 2021, he joined Imolese on loan

On 15 July 2021, he joined Gubbio on loan.

On 8 July 2022, Aurelio moved to Pontedera on a two-year contract.

On 31 January 2023, Aurelio joined Serie B club Palermo for an undisclosed fee, agreeing to sign a contract until 30 June 2027.

References

External links
 
 

2000 births
Living people
People from Bracciano
Footballers from Lazio
Italian footballers
Association football fullbacks
Serie B players
Serie C players
U.S. Sassuolo Calcio players
Cesena F.C. players
Imolese Calcio 1919 players
A.S. Gubbio 1910 players
U.S. Città di Pontedera players
Palermo F.C. players
Sportspeople from the Metropolitan City of Rome Capital